A transient X-ray source first discovered in 1996 by the Italian-Dutch BeppoSAX satellite, SAX J1808.4−3658 revealed X-ray pulsations at the 401 Hz neutron star spin frequency when it was observed during a subsequent outburst in 1998 by NASA's RXTE satellite. The neutron star is orbited by a brown dwarf binary companion with a likely mass of 0.05 solar masses, every 2.01 hours.  X-ray burst oscillations and quasi-periodic oscillations in addition to coherent X-ray pulsations have been seen from SAX J1808.4-3658, making it a Rosetta stone for interpretation of the timing behavior of low-mass X-ray binaries.

These accreting millisecond X-ray pulsars are thought to be the evolutionary progenitors of recycled radio millisecond pulsars. A total of thirteen accreting millisecond X-ray pulsars have been discovered as of January 2011. Three of them are Intermittent millisecond X-ray pulsars (HETE J1900.1-2455, Aql X-1 and SAX J1748.9-2021), i.e. they emit pulsations sporadically during the outburst.

On 21 August 2019 (UTC; 20 August in the US), Neutron Star Interior Composition Explorer (NICER) spotted the brightest X-ray burst so far observed. It came from SAX J1808.4−3658.

References

Accreting millisecond pulsars
Sagittarius (constellation)
Sagittarii, V4580
?